Sarah Parish (born 7 June 1968) is an English actress. She is known for her work on television series including: The Pillars of the Earth, Peak Practice, Hearts and Bones, Cutting It, Doctor Who, Mistresses, Merlin, Atlantis, Monroe, HBO's Industry, Stay Close, Trollied, W1A and as the titular character in Bancroft.

Early life
Parish was born in Yeovil, Somerset, to Bill and Thelma Parish; she has a sister, Julie, and a brother, musician John Parish. She was educated at the local Preston School and Yeovil College. She began acting at an early age and believes her first stage appearance was aged two in a pantomime in the village of Tintinhull playing the pearl in an oyster. She later attended Yeovil Youth Theatre.

Career
After training at the Academy of Live and Recorded Arts in London, her appearance in a cult advert for Manchester-based Boddingtons bitter in 1994 (as Vera, who likes nothing better than "a good rub down with chip fat"), led to a series of roles as Northern women, including Dawn Rudge in Peak Practice (1993), Allie Henshall in Cutting It (2002), Annie Naylor in Trust and Natalie Holden in Blackpool (2004). She starred alongside Debra Messing in the movie The Wedding Date, had a small role in The Holiday, which starred Jude Law, and appeared as the Empress of the Racnoss in the Christmas 2006 Doctor Who episode "The Runaway Bride".

Parish appeared in the one-off drama Recovery. She also starred in the BBC series ShakespeareRe-Told in which she played Beatrice. She returned as GP Katie Roden in series two and three of Mistresses which was first shown on BBC One in February 2009. She played Lady Catrina in the BBC television series Merlin.

In 2011 Parish co-starred in ITV's medical drama Monroe, alongside James Nesbitt. From 2013 to 2015 she appeared in the BBC TV series Atlantis, playing one of the main cast characters, Pasiphaë. From 2014 to 2017 she played the role of Anna Rampton in three series of the BBC TV comedy W1A. Since November 2015 Parish has portrayed Cheryl Fairweather in Sky One sitcom Trollied.

In December 2017, she played Supt Elizabeth Bancroft in the ITV miniseries Bancroft. The second series was broadcast in January 2020.

In December 2019 she appeared in The Cockfields as Melissa, girlfriend of Nigel Havers' character, Larry. She later appeared in the HBO/BBC drama Industry the following year. Parish appeared in Netflix original Stay Close as Lorraine in December 2021.

Co-stars
She has frequently co-starred opposite David Tennant — in the 2004 musical serial Blackpool; the Tony Marchant drama Recovery; the 2006 Doctor Who Christmas special episode, "The Runaway Bride"; in the third series of the ITV crime drama Broadchurch; and in the 2017 film You, Me and Him. She has joked that "We're like George and Mildred – in 20 years' time we'll probably be doing a ropey old sitcom in a terraced house in Preston."

Personal life 
Parish married James Murray on 15 December 2007 in Hampshire. It was announced in January 2008 that she was pregnant with their first child, due on Parish's 40th birthday. Their daughter Ella-Jayne was born with Rubinstein–Taybi syndrome and died in 2009. In her memory, Parish and Murray raise funds for the Paediatric Intensive Care Unit (PICU) at Southampton General Hospital. As of December 2019, they had raised £5.2 million towards the PICU. Their second daughter, Nell, was born on 21 November 2009.

When asked about her hobbies and interests Parish cites her vegetable garden.

On 2 March 2018, Parish sustained an accident, breaking her leg when sledging in the snow. She commented: "Note to self: cheap plastic sledges are for sitting in and gently trundling down primary slopes NOT a substitute for a stand up snowboard".

Filmography
Television

Film

References

External links
 
Sarah Parish stars in Doctor Who: "The Runaway Bride"

Living people
1968 births
20th-century English actresses
21st-century English actresses
Actresses from Somerset
Alumni of the Academy of Live and Recorded Arts
English film actresses
English television actresses
People from Yeovil